Iłownica may refer to the following places in Poland:
 Iłownica, Pomeranian Voivodeship (north Poland)
 Iłownica, Silesian Voivodeship (south Poland)
 Iłownica River, a river in Silesian Voivodeship